This is a list of foreign football players in Superleague Greece. The players written with bold are currently playing in Superleague,

Greek players naturalized and born abroad 
  Loukas Apostolidis – Veria 2007–2008
  Daniel Batista Lima – AEK Athens, Olympiacos, Aris Thessaloniki 1989–2000
  Bruno Chalkiadakis – Ergotelis, Panionios, PAS Giannina 2011–2012, 2013–2016, 2017–
  Elini Dimoutsos – Panathinaikos F.C., OFI Crete, Atromitos, Asteras Tripoli, Platanias 2007–2009, 2010–
  Giorgos Donis – PAS Giannina, Panathinaikos F.C., AEK Athens 1990–1996, 1997–1999
  Fiorin Durmishaj – Panionios, Olympiacos, Aris, AEL 2014–2016, 2017–2019, 2019–2020, 2020–2021
  Dimitrios Ferfelis – PAS Giannina 2015–2017
  Trifon Gioudas – Panthrakikos 2015–2016
  Dimitrios Grammozis – Ergotelis, Kerkyra 2007–2009, 2010–2012
  Minas Hantzidis – Olympiacos, Kastoria, Iraklis Thessaloniki, Veria 1989–1999
  Nikolaos Ioannidis – Asteras Tripoli 2015–2017
  José Holebas – Olympiacos 2010–2014
  Giorgos Kakko – PAOK 2015–2016
  Savvas Kofidis – Olympiacos, Aris Thessaloniki, Iraklis Thessaloniki 1989–1999
  Panagiotis Kone – AEK Athens, Iraklis Thessaloniki 2005–2010, 2017–
  Ioannis Kontis – Panionios 2006–2009
  Kostas Konstantinidis – Pierikos F.C., OFI Crete, Panathinaikos F.C. 1991–1993, 1994–1999, 2005–2007
  Giorgos Machlelis – Niki Volos, Platanias 2014–2015
  Giorgos Manthatis – Olympiacos, PAS Giannina 2016–
  Ilias Melkas – Iraklis Thessaloniki 2008–2009
  Dimitris Moutas – OFI Crete, Athinaikos, Kavala, Panelefsiniakos 1994–1999
  Themistoklis "Demis" Nikolaidis – Apollon Smyrni, AEK Athens 1993–2003
  Sotiris Ninis – Panathinaikos F.C., PAOK F.C. 2006–2012, 2013–2016
  Avraam Papadopoulos – Aris Thessaloniki, Olympiacos 2003–2014, 2019–
  Dimitrios Papadopoulos – Panathinaikos F.C., Levadiakos, Panthrakikos, Atromitos, PAOK, Asteras Tripoli, Panetolikos 2003–2008, 2011–2017
  Peter Philipakos – Olympiacos, Aris Thessaloniki 2004–2006
  Panagiotis Retsos – Olympiacos 2016–2018
  Alexandros Souflas – Atromitos 2006–2007
  Panagiotis Triadis – Skoda Xanthi 2012–
  Michalis Tsamourlidis – Panionios 2013–2014
  Odisseas Vlachodimos – Panathinaikos 2016–18
  Loukas Vyntra – Paniliakos, Panathinaikos F.C. 1999–2000, 2003–2013
  Gennadios Xenodochof – AEL 2016–2017
  Zeca – Panathinaikos F.C. 2011–2018

Listed by country

Albania  
Serxhio Abdurahmani – AEK Athens (2010–2011)
Astrit Ajdarević – AEK Athens (2016–)
Fatjon Andoni – AEL 2016–
Adrian Barbullushi – Ionikos (1992–1995)
Migjen Basha – Aris Thessaloniki 2018–
Arjan Bellaj – PAS Giannina F.C., Kalamata F.C., Apollon Smyrnis, Ethnikos Piraeus F.C., Panionios, Kerkyra F.C.
Arjan Beqaj – OFI Crete, Ionikos (1997–2006)
Efstrat Billa – Atromitos F.C., Akratitos F.C. (2003–2004, 2005–2006)
Alban Bushi – Apollon Kalamarias (2006–2008)
Sulejman Demollari – Panionios
Enea Gaqollari – Skoda Xanthi F.C.
Klodian Gino – Apollon Smyrni (2018–)
Damian Gjini – Panionios F.C. (2014–2015)
Mario Gurma – Panetolikos
Altin Haxhi – Panachaiki, Iraklis Thessaloniki, Apollon Pontou, Ergotelis FC, Apollon Kalamarias (1996–1998, 2000–2003, 2004–2005, 2006–2008, 2010–2011)
Ergys Kaçe – PAOK F.C., Panathinaikos (2010–2011, 2012–)
Bledar Kola – Apollon Smyrni, Panathinaikos, AEK Athens, Kallithea
Enea Koliqi – Iraklis Thessaloniki (2006–2009)
Albi Kondi – Panionios
Qazim Laci – Levadiakos (2016–2017)
Artur Lekbello – Aris Thessaloniki F.C. (1991–1998)
Andi Lila – PAS Giannina
Mërgim Mavraj – Aris Thessaloniki F.C. (2018–)
Neti Meçe – Niki Volos (2014–2015)
Lefter Millo – AEL 1964, Iraklis Thessaloniki
Ledio Pano – Skoda Xanthi F.C., Panelefsiniakos F.C., PAS Giannina
Viktor Paço – AEK Athens (1992–1993)
Kristi Qose – PAOK F.C.
Andi Renja – Aris Thessaloniki F.C. (2012–14)
Simon Rrumbullaku – PAS Giannina, Panetolikos (2012–2016)
Hamdi Salihi – Panionios
Leonard Senka – Levadiakos (2016–2017)
Vasil Shkurti – Panionios, Niki Volos, Asteras Tripoli, Skoda Xanthi (2010–2011, 2014–2016)
Foto Strakosha – PAS Giannina, Ethnikos Piraeus F.C., Olympiacos, Panionios, Ionikos, Kallithea, Ethnikos Asteras, Proodeftiki
Kristi Vangjeli – Aris Thessaloniki F.C. (2003–2011, 2013–2014)
Emiljano Vila – PAS Giannina
Renato Ziko – Platanias (2016–)

Algeria 
Djamel Abdoun – Kavala F.C., Olympiacos, Veria 2010–2013, 2015–2016
Mehdi Abeid – Panathinaikos F.C. 2013–2014
Salim Arrache – PAS Giannina F.C., Asteras Tripoli F.C. 2009–2011
Ismaël Bouzid – PAS Giannina F.C. 2011–2012
Riad Hammadou – PAS Giannina F.C. 2002–2003
Yacine Hadji – Veria 2016–2017
Mohamed Chalali – Veria 2016–2017
Sofyane Cherfa – Panthrakikos 2012–2013, 2014–2016
Laurent Agouazi – Atromitos F.C. 2014–2015
Mansour Boutabout – Ionikos 2000–2001
Youssef Salimi – Ethnikos Asteras 1999–2000
Florent Hanin – Panetolikos 2013–2014
Karim Mouzaoui – Panionios F.C., Apollon Kalamarias, Veria  2001–2003, 2004–2006, 2007–2008
Rafik Djebbour – Atromitos, Panionios F.C., AEK Athens F.C., Olympiacos 2005–2013, 2016–2017
Carl Medjani – Olympiacos 2013–2014
Bark Seghiri – Iraklis Thessaloniki 2004–2006
Karim Soltani – Iraklis Thessaloniki, Skoda Xanthi F.C., PAS Giannina F.C. 2010–2011, 2013–
Antar Yahia – Platanias 2013–2014

Angola 
Djalma Campos – PAOK 2016–
Lourenço da Silva – Panionios F.C. 2006–2009
Manucho – Panathinaikos 2007–2008
Rudy – Skoda Xanthi 2014–2015
Francisco Zuela – Akratitos, Skoda Xanthi, PAOK, Atromitos F.C., Apollon Smyrnis 2005–2009, 2010–2013

Argentina 

A
Juan Pablo Avendaño – Skoda Xanthi
Carlos Araujo – AEK Athens F.C. (2009–2011)
Nicolás Bianchi Arce – AEK Athens F.C.
Rodolfo Arruabarrena – AEK Athens F.C. (2007–2008)
Federico Azcárate – AEK Athens F.C.
Rodrigo Archubi – Olympiacos
B
Juan José Borrelli – Panathinaikos F.C.
Fernando Belluschi – Olympiacos (2007–2009)
Julio Bevacqua – Panthrakikos F.C.
Juan Manuel Barrientos – Thrasyvoulos F.C.
Adrián Bastía – Asteras Tripolis
Roberto Battión – Aris Thessaloniki
Ismael Blanco – AEK Athens F.C.
Diego Buonanotte – AEK Athens F.C.
C
Franco Costanzo – Olympiacos (2011–2012)
Esteban Cambiasso – Olympiacos (2015–2017)
Gaston Caporale – OFI Crete
Patricio Camps – P.A.O.K.
Horacio Cardozo – Asteras Tripolis
Gonzalo Castillejos – Apollon Smyrni (2017–)
Luis Darío Calvo – AEK Athens F.C., Kalamata F.C.
Pablo Cantero – AEK Athens F.C.
D
Jesus Datolo – Olympiacos (2009–10)
Alejandro Domínguez – Olympiacos 2013–2017
Israel Damonte – Asteras Tripolis
Matías Omar Degra – Asteras Tripolis, Veria
Alejandro Delorte – Aris Thessaloniki (2008–09)
Aldo Duscher – Veria
E
Sebastián Ereros – Asteras Tripolis
Emiliano Ellacopulos – Kalloni
Néstor Errea – AEK Athens F.C. (1972–74), Apollon Smyrnis (1974–75, 1976–77)
F
Juan Gilberto Funes – Olympiacos (1988–89)
Darío Fernández – Panionios F.C., Aris F.C. (Thessaloniki)
Luciano Figueroa – Panathinaikos F.C.
Mauricio Ferrari – AEL 1964
Lucio Filomeno – Asteras Tripolis
Lucas Favalli – Apollon Kalamarias, Atromitos, Levadiakos, AEL Kalloni (2006–08, 2009–12, 2015–16)
G
Fernando Galetto – Panathinaikos F.C.
Luciano Galletti – Olympiacos (2007–10)
Ezequiel González – Panathinaikos F.C.
Pitu – Iraklis Thessaloniki
H
Esteban José Herrera – OFI Crete
Ángel Hoyos – Atromitos
Michael Hoyos – OFI Crete 2013–2014
I
Ariel Ibagaza – Olympiacos 2010–2014
Walter Iglesias – AEL 1964
Emanuel Insúa – Panathinaikos 2017–
Juan Insaurralde – P.A.O.K.
Eugenio Isnaldo – Asteras Tripolis 2017–
J
Axel Juárez – Apollon Smyrni 2017–
K
L
Cristian Raúl Ledesma – Olympiacos 2007–2008, 2009–2010
Sebastián Leto – Olympiacos, Panathinaikos F.C.
Fernando Lorefice – Skoda Xanthi
M
Franco Mazurek – Panetolikos 2017–
Eduardo Bustos Montoya – Levadiakos F.C.
Javier Malagueño – Iraklis Thessaloniki
Carlos Alberto Massara – Asteras Tripolis
Gaston Martina – Asteras Tripolis
Mauro Milano – Asteras Tripolis
Hernán Esteban Medina – AEK Athens F.C.
N
Leonel Núñez – Olympiacos, OFI Crete
Cristian Nasuti – Aris Thessaloniki, AEK Athens F.C.
Fernando Navas – AEK Athens F.C., Aris Thessaloniki, Panionios
O
P
Sergio Daniel Ponce – Panthrakikos F.C.
Mauro Poy – Skoda Xanthi
Sebastián Penco – Skoda Xanthi
Facundo Parra – AEL 1964
Emanuel Perrone – Ionikos, Apollon Kalamarias, Atromitos, Asteras Tripolis, Kalloni
Matías Pavoni – Asteras Tripolis
Martín Pautasso – AEK Athens F.C.
Agustín Pelletieri – AEK Athens F.C.
Livio Prieto – AEK Athens F.C.
Q
Diego Quintana – Skoda Xanthi
R
David Reano – Veria 2013–2014
Rodrigo Rey – P.A.O.K. 2017–
Sebastián Romero – Panathinaikos F.C. 2006–2008
Lautaro Rinaldi – Panathinaikos F.C.
Juan Ramón Rocha – Panathinaikos F.C., Aris Thessaloniki
Diego Romano – Ergotelis F.C.
Patito Rodríguez – AEK Athens F.C.
Emanuel Ruiz – AEK Athens F.C.
S
Gabriel Schürrer – Olympiacos 2004–2006
Javier Saviola – Olympiacos 2013–2014
Esteban Solari – Skoda Xanthi
Juan Sánchez Sotelo – Levadiakos F.C.
Marcelo Sarmiento – AEL 1964
Sebastián Saja – AEK Athens F.C. 2008–2011
Ignacio Scocco – AEK Athens F.C. 2008–2011
T
Lucas Trejo – Atromitos
U
Bruno Urribarri – Asteras Tripolis
V
Ricardo Matias Verón – P.A.O.K.
Ricardo Verón – OFI Crete
Rodolfo Gregorio Vicente – AEK Athens F.C.
Lucas Villafáñez – Panetolikos, Panathinaikos F.C.
Tomas De Vincenti – PAS Giannina, Olympiacos
Ivan Valian – Kalamata F.C. (1974–75); Apollon Athinas (1975–76); Kavala F.C. (1976–80)
W
X
Y
Z
Hugo Horacio Zerr – AEK Athens F.C.
Bruno Zuculini – AEK Athens F.C.

Armenia 
Gaël Andonian – Veria – 2016–2017
Romik Khachatryan – OFI Crete 2004–2006
Zhora Hovhannisyan – Olympiacos
Gevorg Ghazaryan – Olympiacos 2014–2015
Arman Karamyan – Panachaiki Patras 2002–2003
Artavazd Karamyan – Panachaiki Patras 2002–2003
Marcos Pizzelli – Xanthi – 2016–2017

Australia 
John Anastasiadis – PAOK
Terry Antonis – PAOK, Veria 2015–2017
Dean Bouzanis – Aris FC 2013–2014
Nathan Burns – AEK Athens
Alvin Ceccoli – AEK Athens 1998–1999
Louis Christodoulou – Panathinaikos
Ante Čović – PAOK
Travis Dodd – Panionios
Apostolos Giannou – Apollon Kalamarias, Kavala, PAOK, Panionios, Asteras Tripoli 2007–2016
Zeljko Kalac – Kavala
Chris Kalantzis – Olympiacos, Panathinaikos
Billy Konstantinidis – Veria 2016–2017
Theo Markelis – Veria
Craig Moore – Kavala
Jim Patikas – AEK Athens, Athinaikos
Steve Refenes – Olympiacos 1992–1996
Robert Stambolziev – Niki Volou 2014–2015
Andrew Vlahos – Panathinaikos
James Jeggo – Aris 2020-

Austria 
Michael Gspurning – Skoda Xanthi, PAOK 2007–2012, 2013–2014
Mario Hieblinger – Ergotelis F.C. 2006–2012
Andreas Ivanschitz – Panathinaikos F.C. 2006–2011
Andreas Lasnik – Panionios 2013–2014
Jürgen Leitner – Skoda Xanthi 2001–2003  
Jürgen Macho – AEK Athens F.C., Panionios 2007–2009, 2010–2013
Thomas Murg – PAOK 2020–
Gernot Plassnegger – Ergotelis F.C. 2008–2009
Stefan Schwab – PAOK 2020–
Srđan Spiridonović – Panionios 2017–2019
Roman Wallner – Apollon Kalamarias, Skoda Xanthi 2007–2009
Kurt Welzl – Olympiacos 1984–1985

Azerbaijan 
Araz Abdullayev – Panionios GSS 2011–2012
Amit Guluzade – AEL – 2016–2017
Anatoly Ponomarev – Skoda Xanthi 2002–2003

Belarus  
Dzmitry Baha  – Atromitos
Andrey Gorbunov – Atromitos
Vital Hayduchyk – Asteras Tripoli 2016–2017
Syarhey Vyeramko  – Levadiakos
Vitali Zhaludok  – Platanias

Belgium 
Ziguy Badibanga – Ergotelis, Asteras Tripoli 2014–2015
Wouter Corstjens – Panetolikos 2015–2016
Björn Engels – Olympiacos 2017–19
Ritchie Kitoko – Asteras Tripoli 2014–2016
Viktor Klonaridis – AEK Athens, Panathinaikos F.C. 2013–2016, 2017–
Erwin Lemmens – Olympiacos 2005–2006
Maarten Martens – PAOK 2014–2015
Kevin Mirallas – Olympiacos 2010–2012, 2017-2018
Mbo Mpenza – AEL 1964 2007–2008
Vadis Odjidja-Ofoe – Olympiacos 2017–18
Tristan Peersman – OFI Crete 2007–2008
Silvio Proto – Olympiacos 2017–18

Benin 
Moise Adilehou – Kerkyra, Levadiakos 2016–

Bolivia 
Danny Bejarano - Panetolikos 2015–18, Lamia 2019–
Diego Bejarano – Panetolikos 2014–2016
Nacho García – Aris Thessaloniki F.C. 2005–2012

Brazil 
Márcio Amoroso – Aris Thessaloniki F.C. 2007–2008
Paulo Assunção – AEK Athens F.C. 2004–2005
Marco Aurélio – Aris Thessaloniki F.C.
Marcos Bambam – Ergotelis 2013–2015
Binho – Iraklis Thessaloniki
Brandão – Levadiakos 2017–
Jean Carlos – Asteras Tripolis
Júlio César – AEK Athens F.C.
Alex Leandro de Souza – Iraklis Thessaloniki
Éder – Asteras Tripolis, AEK Athens
Rodrigo Ferrugem – AEK Athens
Flávio – Asteras Tripolis
João Francisco – Levadiakos 2017–
Anderson de Lima Freitas – Atromitos
Thiago Gentil – Aris Thessaloniki F.C.
Wellington Gonçalves – Apollon Kalamarias
Guga – AEL 1964
Ronaldo Guiaro – Aris Thessaloniki F.C.
Huanderson – Iraklis Thessaloniki
Edson Ratinho – AEK Athens F.C. 2007–2009
Júnior – Ergotelis FC, Panetolikos
Giuseppe Vela Junior – Apollon Kalamarias
Madson – Atromitos 2017–
Gustavo Manduca – AEK Athens F.C.
Marcelão – Asteras Tripolis
Sergio Marica – AEK Athens F.C.
Rogério Martins – Ergotelis FC
Maurício – Ergotelis FC
Marcelo Moretto – AEK Athens F.C.
Neto – Aris Thessaloniki F.C.
Siston – Aris Thessaloniki F.C.
Marcelo Oliveira – Atromitos
Marcos Bambam – Ergotelis FC
Emerson de Andrade Santos – Iraklis Thessaloniki
Alexandre Soares – Kalamata, OFI Crete, AEK Athens F.C.
Cleyton – AEL 1964
Leozinho – OFI Crete, Kalloni, Iraklis Thessaloniki
Zé Eduardo – OFI Crete
Rivaldo – Olympiacos, AEK Athens F.C. 2004–2008
Júlio César – Olympiacos
Zé Elias – Olympiacos 2000–2003
Giovanni – Olympiacos 1999–2005
Dudu Cearense – Olympiacos, OFI Crete 2008–2011, 2013–2014
Alexandre D'Acol – Olympiacos, Panionios
Edu Dracena – Olympiacos 2002–2003
Leandro – Doxa Drama, Kalloni, PAS Giannina 2011–2012, 2013–2014
Leonardo – Levadiakos 2017–
Leandro Salino – Olympiacos
Leandro – Olympiacos, Kalloni
Luciano – Olympiacos, Skoda Xanthi, PAOK, Panionios, Atromitos
Marcelo Macedo – Panserraikos F.C.
Marcelo Mattos – Panathinaikos F.C.
Rodrigo Moledo – Panathinaikos F.C.
Sebá – Olympiacos
Allan – PAOK FC
Baiano – PAOK FC
Bruno Viana – Olympiacos
Júlio César – Panathinaikos F.C. 1998–1999
Flávio Conceição – Panathinaikos F.C. 2005–2006
Souza – Panathinaikos F.C.
Gilberto Silva – Panathinaikos F.C. 2008–2011
Gabriel – Panathinaikos F.C.
Ricardo Bóvio – Panathinaikos F.C.
Rafael Bracalli – Panetolikos
Rodrigo Galo – Panetolikos, AEK Athens
Marcelo Pletsch – Panionios
Anderson Gonzaga – Panionios
Robinho – Panthrakikos F.C.
Romeu – Panthrakikos F.C.
Leandro – Thrasyvoulos F.C., Levadiakos, AEK Athens F.C.
Maciel – Skoda Xanthi
Marcelinho – Skoda Xanthi
Marcelo – Skoda Xanthi, AEK Athens F.C.
Marlon – Thrasyvoulos F.C.
Luís Miguel – Thrasyvoulos F.C.
Peterson Peçanha – Thrasyvoulos F.C.
Juliano Spadacio – PAOK FC
Igor – Panthrakikos F.C.
Wanderson – Olympiacos
Lino – PAOK FC
Marcos Antônio – PAOK FC
Emerson – Skoda Xanthi, AEK Athens F.C.
Dorival – Skoda Xanthi
Elton Figueiredo – Skoda Xanthi 2015–2016
Marcelo Vieira da Silva Júnior - Olympiacos

Bosnia and Herzegovina 
Dušan Bajević – AEK Athens 1977–1981
Azer Bušuladžić – Atromitos F.C. 2017–
Haris Dilaver – Platanias – 2016–2017
Mladen Furtula – PAOK 1975–1984
Sanel Jahić – Aris Thessaloniki, AEK Athens, Levadiakos 2008–2011, 2015–2016
Zlatan Muslimović – PAOK 2008–2011
Branislav Nikić – Kerkyra – 2016–17
Nikola Nikić – Aris Thessaloniki, PAOK 1985–1988
Rade Paprica – PAOK 1984–1986
Refik Šabanadžović – AEK Athens, Olympiacos 1991–1998
Mirza Varešanović – Olympiacos 1996–1998
Ognjen Vranješ – AEK Athens  2016–

Bulgaria 
Dimitar Berbatov – PAOK 2015–2016
Hristo Bonev – AEK Athens 1979–1981
Diyan Donchev – AEK Athens 2000–2001
Valeri Domovchiyski – Levadiakos F.C. 2015–2016
Vladimir Gadzhev – OFI Crete 2007–2008
Borislav Georgiev – Levadiakos F.C. 2008–2009
Ilian Iliev – AEK Athens 1998–1999
Ivan Ivanov  – Panathinaikos 2016–2017
Angel Kolev – AEK Athens 1982–1984
Emil Kremenliev – Olympiacos 1995–1996
Daniel Kutev – Skoda Xanthi 2012–2013
Pavel Panov – Aris Thessaloniki F.C. 1981–1982
Milen Petkov – AEK Athens, Atromitos F.C. 2000–2006
Ivan Rusev – AEK Athens 2003–2005
Igor Tomašić – Kavala 2010–2011

Burkina Faso 
Habib Bamogo – Panetolikos 2011–2012
Abdul Diallo – Panthrakikos F.C. 2008–2010
Patrick Zoundi – Asteras Tripolis 2006–2008

Burundi 
Nuredin Ndikumana – AEL 1964

Cameroon  
Thierry Modo Abouna – AEL 1964 2004–2007
Christian Bekamenga – Skoda Xanthi 2010–2011
Steve Leo Beleck – Panthrakikos, AEK Athens 2009–2010, 2011–2012
André Bikey – Panetolikos 2013–2014
Gaëtan Bong – Olympiacos 2013–2014
Olivier Boumal – Panionios, Panathinaikos 2014–2017
Guy Bwelle – Ergotelis FC  2006–2007
Pierre Ebéde – Apollon Kalamarias, Panathinaikos 1998–2002, 2005–2007
David Embé – AEL 1964 1994–1996
Joël Epalle – Ethnikos Piraeus F.C., Panachaiki, Aris Thessaloniki, Panathinaikos, Iraklis Thessaloniki 1998–2007
David Eto'o – Aris Thessaloniki F.C. 2007–2008
Nana Falemi – Ergotelis F.C. 2004–2005
Guy Feutchine – PAOK 2000–2006
Jean-Pierre Fiala – AEL 1964 1995–1996
Geremi – AEL 1964 2010–2011
Jérôme Guihoata – Panionios 2016–
Serge Honi – AEL 1964 1995–1996
Charles Itandje – PAOK, Atromitos 2010–2013, 2014–2015
Mulamba Kaniemba – AEL 1964 
Dorge Kouemaha – Aris Thessaloniki F.C. 2004–2005
Jean Makoun – Olympiacos 2011–2012
Patrice Noukeu – Skoda Xanthi 2007–2008
Franck Songo'o – PAS Giannina 2013–2014

Canada 
Julian de Guzman – Skoda Xanthi 2013–2014
Stathis Kappos – AEK Athens F.C. 2001–2004
John Limniatis – Aris Thessaloniki 1988–1992
Tomasz Radzinski – Skoda Xanthi 2007–2008
Kenny Stamatopoulos – Kalamata 1999–2002
Igor Vrablic – Olympiacos 1986–1987
Emmanuel Zambazis – Iraklis 2014–2017
Tamandani Nsaliwa – Panionios, AEK Athens F.C. 2006–2009Derek Cornelius – Panetolikos 2021–

 Cape Verde Islands Brito – Skoda Xanthi 2017–
José Emílio Furtado – AEK Athens 2012–2013
Noni Lima – Panionios 1976–1988
Garry Rodrigues – PAOK 2015–2017, Olympiacos F.C., 
Valdo – Asteras Tripoli 2013–14Fernando Varela – PAOK 2016–
Toni Varela – Levadiakos 2013–2014

 Central African Republic David Manga – Asteras Tripolis – 2018–
 Frédéric Nimani – PAOK, OFI Crete – 2011–12, 2013–14Lionel Zouma – Asteras Tripolis – 2016–

 Chad 
Azrack Mahamat – Platanias, Levadiakos 2014–2016

 Chile 
Mario Cáceres – Aris Thessaloniki
Pablo Contreras – P.A.O.K. 2008–2012
Fabián Estay – Olympiacos 1993–1995
Gamadiel Garcia – Skoda Xanthi
César Henríquez – Panthrakikos F.C.
Alejandro Hisis – OFI Crete
José Luis Jerez – Panserraikos F.C.
Eros Pérez – Skoda Xanthi
Francisco Ugarte – PAS Giannina
Jaime Vera  – OFI Crete 1987–1992

 Colombia Diego Arias – PAOK
Jorge Bermúdez – Olympiacos 2001–2003
Víctor Ibarbo – Panathinaikos 2016–2017Felipe Pardo – OlympiacosJuan Pablo Pino – OlympiacosJuan Carlos Toja – ArisAdolfo Valencia – PAOKFabián Andrés Vargas – AEK AthensJames Rodriguez – Olympiacos

 Comoros El Fardou Ben Nabouhane – Veria, Olympiacos, Levadiakos, Panionios 2013–
Halifa Soulé – OFI Crete, Veria 2016–2017Mohamed Youssouf – Ergotelis, Levadiakos 2014–2015, 2017– 

 Congo Clévid Dikamona – Platanias 2017–
Christopher Maboulou – PAS Giannina 2016–2017
Delvin N'Dinga – Olympiacos 2013–2015
Christopher Samba – Panathinaikos 2016–2017

 Congo D.R. 
Jonathan Bijimine – Apollon Smyrni 2017–18 
Patrick Dimbala – Levadiakos, PAS Giannina, Panionios, Kalloni 2007–2010, 2011–12, 2014 
Masengo Ilunga – Ethnikos Piraeus 1982–1988
Wilson Kamavuaka – Panetolikos 2016–2017
Lomana LuaLua – Olympiacos 2007–2008, 2009–2010
Paul-José M'Poku – Panathinaikos 2016–2017
Arthur Masuaku – Olympiacos 2014–2016
Olivier N'Siabamfumu – AEK Athens 2008–2009Clarck N'Sikulu – Platanias 2017–18, Atromitos 2018- 
Gabriel Zakuani – Kalloni 2013–2014

 Costa Rica 
Joel Campbell – Olympiacos 2013–2014
Walter Centeno – AEK 2002–2003
Mayron George – OFI Crete 2014–2015
Rónald Gómez – OFI Crete 1999–2002
Wilson Muñoz – OFI Crete
Alonso Solís – OFI Crete
Mauricio Solís – OFI Crete
Mauricio Wright – AEK

 Croatia 
Srđan Andrić – Panathinaikos F.C. 2004–2007
Aljoša Asanović – Panathinaikos F.C. 1998–2000
Igor Bišćan – Panathinaikos F.C. 2005–2007
Mario Budimir – Ergotelis FC 2007–2012
Tomislav Butina – Olympiacos 2006–2008
Danijel Cesarec – Asteras Tripolis 2007–2010Ivan Čović – Apollon Smyrni 2017–
Dino Drpić – AEK Athens 2010–2011
Tonči Gabrić – PAOK 1991–1993
Mario Galinović – Panathinaikos F.C., Kavala, Kerkyra 2004–2012
Robert Jarni – Panathinaikos F.C. 2001–2004
Dario Krešić – PAOK 2009–2012Sandi Križman – AEL 2017–Marko Livaja – AEK Athens 2017–
Silvio Marić – Panathinaikos F.C. 2003–2005
Tomislav Mikulić – Panthrakikos 2013–2014
Goran Milanko – PAOK 1994–1995Hrvoje Milić – Olympiacos 2017–
Danijel Pranjić – Panathinaikos 2013–2016
Mladen Petrić – Panathinaikos 2014–2016
Zdravko Popović – OFI Crete, Levadiakos, Atromitos 2007–2012
Ivan Režić – Olympiacos 2004–2006Goran Roce – Skoda Xanthi 2017– 
Daniel Šarić – Panathinaikos F.C. 2000–2003
Gordon Schildenfeld – PAOK, Panathinaikos 2012–2015
Anthony Šerić – Panathinaikos F.C. 2005–2008
Zoran Slišković – AEK Athens 1992–1994
Ivan Turina – Skoda Xanthi 2007–2008
Goran Vlaović – Panathinaikos F.C. 2000–2004
Velimir Zajec – Panathinaikos F.C. 1984–1988Nikola Žižić – AEL 2017–

 Curaçao 
Chaly Jones – Skoda Xanthi 2005–2006

 Cyprus 
Marios Agathokleous – Aris Thessaloniki FC 1998–2001
Nektarios Alexandrou – AEL 1964 2006–2008
Stathis Aloneftis – AEL 1964 2005–2007
Marios Antoniades – Panionios 2016–2017
Georgios Aresti – AEK Athens 2012–2013Kostakis Artymatas – Kerkyra 2017–
Andreas Avraam – AEL 1964 2016–2017
Constantinos Charalambidis – Panathinaikos, PAOK FC 2004–2007
Elias Charalambous – PAOK FC, Levadiakos 2005–2007, 2013–2014
Christos Charalampous – Panthrakikos F.C. 2006–2009
Costas Elia – Skoda Xanthi 2002–2003
Nikos Englezou – AEK Athens 2011–2012
Panayiotis Engomitis – PAOK FC 2000–2006
Dimitris Froxylias – AEK Athens 2010–2011
Alexandros Garpozis – PAOK, Skoda Xanthi  2004–2007
Antonis Georgallides – Platanias 2013–2014
Siniša Gogić – Olympiacos 1997–2000
Georgios Kolokoudias – Panserraikos 1964 F.C. 2007–2008
Michalis Konstantinou – Iraklis Thessaloniki, Panathinaikos, Olympiacos 1997–2008
Simos Krassas – AEK Athens, Panionios 2004–2006
Theodosis Kyprou – Kalloni 2014–2015
Liasos Louka – PAOK FC 2003–2005
Costas Malekkos – Panathinaikos 1996–1997
Stefanos Mouhtaris – Panionios – 2016–2017
Alexandre Negri – Aris Thessaloniki 2006–2007
Marios Nicolaou – Panionios 2007–2010
Ioannis Okkas – PAOK FC, AEK Athens, Olympiacos 2000–2007
Fotios Papoulis – Panthrakikos, OFI Crete 2009–2010, 2011–2012
Urko Rafael Pardo – Iraklis Thessaloniki, Olympiacos 2007–2008, 2009–2011
Kyriacos Pavlou – Panionios 2006–2007
Giorgos Savvidis – AEK Athens 1987–1992
Georgios Tofas – AEK Athens F.C. 2007–2008
Stefanos Voskaridis – PAOK FC 1999–2004
Yiasoumis Yiasoumi – PAOK FC 2001–2007

 Czech Republic 
Jaroslav Drobný – Panionios 2001–2005
Jan Hable – Kerkyra 2010–2013
Tomáš Necid – PAOK 2013–2014
Martin Knakal – Skoda Xanthi 2007–2008
Tomáš Pekhart – AEK Athens F.C. 2015–2017
Jakub Podaný – Kalloni 2013–2014
Václav Svěrkoš – Panionios 2010–2011
František Štambachr – AEK Athens F.C., Apollon Smyrni 1983–1985
Petr Trapp – Veria 2013–2014
Martin Vaniak – Panionios 2005–2006
Petr Vlček – Panionios 2001–2005
Martin Zbončák – Iraklis Thessaloniki 2006–2007
Jakub Brabec – Aris Thessaloniki F.C. 2021 -
Tomáš Vaclík – Olympiacos 2021 -

 Denmark  
Bent Christensen Arensøe – Olympiacos
René Henriksen – Panathinaikos
Jan Michaelsen – Panathinaikos 
Claus Nielsen – Panathinaikos 
Henrik Nielsen – AEK Athens, Iraklis Thessaloniki
Dennis Rommedahl – Olympiacos 
Rasmus Thelander – Panathinaikos
Nicki Bille Nielsen – Panionios

 Ecuador  
Félix Borja – Olympiacos 2006–2007
Juan Carlos Paredes – Olympiacos 2016–2017

 Egypt 
Amr Al-Halawni – Apollon Kalamarias
Hossam Hassan – P.A.O.K.
Ibrahim Hassan – P.A.O.K.
Ahmed Magdy – Atromitos, Panionios
Abdel Sattar Sabry – P.A.O.K.
Shikabala – P.A.O.K.
Magdy Tolba – P.A.O.K.
Amr Warda – Panetolikos
Ahmed Hassan (footballer, born 1993) – Olympiacos F.C.

 England 
Darren Ambrose – Apollon Smyrni 2013–2014
Chuba Akpom - PAOK 2018-2020
Lee Cook – Apollon Smyrni 2013–2014
Matt Derbyshire – Olympiacos 2008–2010
Walter Figueira – Platanias F.C. 2014–2015
Tommy Langley – AEK Athens 1983–1984
Micky Quinn – PAOK 1995–1996
Mark Robins – Panionios 1998–1999
Trevor Ross – AEK Athens 1982–1983
Joleon Lescott – AEK Athens 2016–2017
Mike Small – PAOK 1988–1990
Luke Steele – Panathinaikos 2014–2017
Jordan Stewart – Skoda Xanthi F.C. 2010–2011
Wayne Thomas – Atromitos F.C., Veria 2011–2013

 Equatorial Guinea Kike Boula – Xanthi 2017–
Lawrence Doe – Platanias 2012–2013Viera Ellong – Kerkyra 2015–

 Estonia 
Sander Puri – AEL 1964 FC

 Finland  
Perparim Hetemaj – AEK Athens F.C., Apollon Kalamarias 2006–2009
Njazi Kuqi – Panionios, Atromitos 2011–2013
Joonas Kolkka – Panathinaikos 2001–2003
Robin Lod – Panathinaikos 2015–18

 France 
Eric Abidal – Olympiacos 2014–2015
Christian Bassila – AEL 1964 2006–2007Franck Betra – PAS Giannina 2017–
Jean-Alain Boumsong – Panathinaikos 2010–2013
Djibril Cissé – Panathinaikos 2009–2011
Aly Cissokho – Olympiacos 2016–2017
Maurice Dalé – Panserraikos 2010–2011
Wilfried Dalmat – Panetolikos 2013–2014
Didier Domi – Olympiacos 2006–2010
Davis Epassy – Levadiakos 2017–
Guy Gnabouyou – Kalloni 2013–2014
Sidney Govou – Panathinaikos 2010–2011
Florent Hanin – Panetolikos 2013–2014
Maxime Josse – Panthrakikos, Kalloni 2013–2014
Cyril Kali – Asteras Tripoli, Panserraikos, Veria, AEL 1964, Panetolikos 2007–2012, 2013–2014
Olivier Kapo – Levadiakos 2013–2014
Christian Karembeu – Olympiacos 2001–2004Lynel Kitambala – Apollon Smyrni 2017–
Maxim Laroque – OFI Crete
Anthony Le Tallec – Atromitos 2015–2017Dorian Lévêque – PAOK 2017–
Nicolas Marin – Skoda Xanthi 2012–2014
François Modesto – Olympiacos 2010–2013
Hervaine Moukam – Asteras Tripoli 2014–2016
David N'Gog – Panionios 2016–2017David Oberhauser – Platanias 2017–
Alain Raguel – Iraklis Thessaloniki 2007–2008
Bertrand Robert – Panthrakikos, PAOK 2009–2013
Laurent Robert – Larissa 2008–2009
Amadou Sanokho – Atromitos 2006–2008
Sonhy Sefil – Asteras Tripolis 2016–2017
Olivier Sorlin – PAOK 2008–2010Salimo Sylla – Skoda Xanthi 2016–
Xavier Tomas – Levadiakos 2014–2015
Pascal Vahirua – Atromitos 1998–2001

 French Polynesia 
Marama Vahirua – Panthrakikos 2012–2013

 Gabon  
Henry Antchouet – AEL 1964 2006–2007
Daniel Cousin – AEL 1964 2010–2011Lévy Madinda – Asteras Tripoli 2017–

 Gambia Njogu Demba-Nyrén – PAS Giannina, Aris, Panathinaikos, Kerkyra 2001–2005
Mustapha Kamal – Veria 2008–2009
Edrissa Sonko – Skoda Xanthi 2006–2007

 Germany 
Michael Delura – Panionios 2007–2009
Denis Epstein – Iraklis Thessaloniki, Kerkyra, Atromitos 2008–2013
Marco Foerster – AEL 1964 2004–2008
Fabian Gerber – OFI Crete 2007–2009
Marko Marin – Olympiacos 2016–18
Ivica Majstorović – PAS Giannina 2009–2010
Alberto Mendez – AEK Athens 1998–1999
Markus Münch – Panathinaikos 2003–2005
Karlheinz Pflipsen – Panathinaikos 1999–2001
Holger Trimhold – PAOK 1982–1984
Marco Villa – Panathinaikos 2000–2001
Walter Wagner – AEK Athens, Aris Thessaloniki, Panathinaikos, Panachaiki 1974–1979, 1980–1981Samed Yeşil – Panionios 2016–
Timo Zahnleiter – AEK Athens 1974–1977

 Georgia 
Temuri Ketsbaia – AEK Athens 1994–1997
Akaki Khubutia – Kerkyra 2014–2015
Dato Kvirkvelia – Panionios 2011–2012
Levan Maghradze – Skoda Xanthi 2004–2007
Giorgi Merebashvili – OFI Crete, Veria, Levadiakos 2014–2016
Giorgi Navalovski – Veria 2016–2017
Giorgi Shashiashvili – Ergotelis 2009–2012
Levan Tskitishvili – Panionios 2006–2007

 Ghana 
Felix Aboagye – Olympiacos 1998–1999
David Addy – Panetolikos 2011–2012
Koffi Amponsah – Panelefsiniakos, Olympiacos, PAOK FC, AEK Athens, Egaleo FC, Apollon Kalamarias 1998–2008
Derek Boateng – Kalamata F.C., Panathinaikos, OFI Crete 1999–2005
Michael Essien – Panathinaikos 2015–2016
Ebenezer Hagan – Kalamata F.C., Iraklis Thessaloniki, PAOK FC 1995–2005
Samuel Inkoom – Platanias 2013–2014Owusu-Ansah Kontor – AEL Larissa 2016–
Bennard Yao Kumordzi – Egaleo FC, Panionios 2006–2012
Peter Ofori-Quaye – Kalamata F.C., Olympiacos, OFI Crete 1995–2003, 2005–2007
Abdul Aziz Tetteh – Platanias 2013–2015
Mubarak Wakaso – Panathinaikos 2016–2017
Seidu Yahaya – AEK Athens 2009–2010

 Guadeloupe Franck Grandel – Skoda Xanthi

 Guatemala Carlos Ruiz – Aris, PAS GianninaGuillermo Ramírez – PAS Giannina

 Guinea-Bissau 
Esmaël Gonçalves – Veria 2014–2015
Daniel Kenedy – Ergotelis FC 2006–2009Toni Silva – Levadiakos 2016-Zezinho – Veria, Levadiakos 2013–2014, 2016-

 Guinea 
Abdoul Camara – PAOK 2012–2013
Abdoul Salam Sow – Skoda Xanthi 1998–1999
Jean Marie Sylla – Ergotelis, Kallithea, Apollon, OFI Crete 2003–2008
Mady Camara – Olympiacos F.C.
Aguibou Camara – Olympiacos F.C.
Algassime Bah – Olympiacos F.C.

 Haiti  
Frantz Bertin – OFI Crete, Veria 2009–2011, 2012–2013
Kim Jaggy – Skoda Xanthi 2009–2011
Jean-Jacques Pierre – Panionios 2011–2012

 Honduras 
Carlo Costly – Veria 2012–2013Alfredo Mejía – Xanthi F.C. 2017-

 Hungary Dániel Tőzsér – AEK Athens F.C.
Márton Esterházy – AEK Athens F.C., PanathinaikosLajos Détári – OlympiacosImre Boda – Olympiakos Volos, OFI Crete
Zsolt Posza – Ergotelis FC
Péter Orosz – OFI Crete
Zsolt Laczkó – Olympiacos
Balázs Megyeri – Olympiacos
Krisztián Németh – Olympiacos, AEK Athens F.C., Olympiakos VolouSándor Torghelle–Panathinaikos F.C., PAOK FC
Gergely Rudolf – Panathinaikos F.C.
Norbert Tóth – Panionios
Zoltán Kovács – PAOK FC

 Iceland  
Ríkharður Daðason – Kalamata 1996–1997
Alfreð Finnbogason – Olympiacos 2015–2016
Arnar Grétarsson – AEK Athens F.C. 1997–2000
Eiður Guðjohnsen – AEK Athens F.C. 2011–2012
Elfar Freyr Helgason – AEK Athens F.C. 2011–2012
Helgi Sigurðsson – Panathinaikos 1999–2001
Arnór Ingvi Traustason – AEK Athens F.C. – 2017–2018
Ögmundur Kristinsson (footballer, born 1989) – Olympiacos, Athlitiki Enosi Larissa F.C.
Sverrir Ingi Ingason – PAOK

 Indonesia Bagus Kahfi – Asteras Tripoli 2022–

 Iran 
Gholamhossein Hashempour – Larissa
Alireza Mansourian – Skoda Xanthi, Apollon Smyrnis
Nima Nakisa – Kavala
Karim Ansarifard – Panionios, Olympiacos, AEK Athens
Masoud Shojaei – Panionios, AEK Athens
Ehsan Hajsafi – Panionios, Olympiacos, AEK Athens
Milad Mohammadi – AEK Athens

 Iraq 
Mohanad Ali – Aris Thessaloniki F.C. 2021 - 2022

 Republic of Ireland 
Paul Bannon – PAOK, AEL 1964 1987–1989
Liam Lawrence – PAOK 2012–2014

 Israel 
Shimon Abuhatzira – AEL 1964 2009–2011Omri Altman – Panathinaikos 2017–
Asael Ben Shabat – Panthrakikos 2013–2014
Eyal Golasa – PAOK 2014–2016
Bibras Natcho – PAOK 2013–2014, Olympiacos F.C.
Salim Tuama – AEL 1964 2009–2010

 Ivory Coast Kanga Akalé – PanetolikosIbrahima Bakayoko – AEL 1964, PAOK FC, PAS Giannina
Abdul Diallo – Panthrakikos F.C.Serge Dié – Iraklis, Kavala, Skoda Xanthi
Gilles Domoraud – Apollon Kalamarias, Panionios, Aris Thessaloniki, PAS Giannina
Cedric Gondo – Asteras Tripoli  2016–2018
Franck Guela – Apollon Smyrnis, AEL 1964, Kerkyra
Lossémy Karaboué – Levadiakos 2016–2017
Emmanuel Koné – Levadiakos, Apollon Smyrnis
Abdoulaye Méïté – OFI Crete 2014–2015Marco Né – Olympiacos
Ibrahim Sissoko – Panathinaikos
Yaya Touré – Olympiacos
Thierry Zahui – LevadiakosMarco Zoro – OFI Crete

 Italy 
Giuseppe Aquaro – Panetolikos 2012–2014
Davide Belotti – AEK Athens 1999–2000Luigi Cennamo – Egaleo, Panetolikos, Atromitos 1999–2000, 2010–2012, 2013–2015, 2017–
Bruno Cirillo – AEK Athens, PAOK 2005–2007, 2009–2012
Filippo Dal Moro – AEK Athens 1999–2000
Antonio Donnarumma – Asteras Tripoli 2016–2017
Nicolao Dumitru – Veria 2014–2015
Nicola Leali – Olympiacos 2016–2017
Cristian Ledesma – Panathinaikos 2016–2017
Enzo Maresca – Olympiacos 2009–2010
Giandomenico Mesto – Panathinaikos 2015–2017
Gaetano Monachello – Ergotelis 2013–2014
Stefano Napoleoni – Levadiakos F.C., Atromitos 2012–2016
Giuseppe Signori – Iraklis Thessaloniki 2004–2005
Stefano Sorrentino – AEK Athens 2005–2007
Mirko Taccola – PAOK 1998–2000

 Japan  Shinji Kagawa - PAOK
Yohei Kajiyama – Panathinaikos 2012–2013
Daigo Kobayashi – Iraklis 2009–2011
Daisuke sakata-aris2011

 Jordan 
Odai Al-Saify – Skoda Xanthi 2009–2010

 Kenya  
Paul Were – Kalloni

 Kosovo Suad Sahiti – AEL 2018–

 Latvia  
Kaspars Gorkšs – Ergotelis 2014–2015
Jānis Ikaunieks – AEL 2016–2017
Māris Verpakovskis – Ergotelis 2013–2014

 Lebanon 
Hilal El-Helwe – Apollon Smyrnis 2018–2019
Wael Nazha – Kavala 1999–2000

 Liberia Francis Doe – AtromitosKelvin Sebwe – Skoda Xanthi, AEK Athens, Iraklis ThessalonikiOliver Makor – Proodeftiki FC, Egaleo FC, Ionikos FCChristopher Wreh – AEK Athens
Joe Nagbe – PAOK Thessaloniki, Panionios, PAS GianninaZizi Roberts – Panionios, Olympiacos, IonikosIsaac Pupo – PanioniosDulee Johnson – Panetolikos
Sekou Oliseh – PAOK

 Lithuania Raimondas Žutautas – PanathinaikosDeividas Česnauskis – Ergotelis, Aris ThessalonikiGintaras Staučė – Akratitos F.C.

 Luxembourg Vahid Selimović – OFI Crete F.C.

 North Macedonia Boban Babunski – AEK AthensToni Savevski – AEK AthensDragan Stojkov – Egaleo FCDragan Načevski – Kerkyra FCVladimir Dimitrovski – Kerkyra FCZoran Baldovaliev – Kerkyra FCGoran Maznov – Kerkyra FC, ErgotelisJovan Kostovski – OFI CreteVance Sikov – Olympiacos, Apollon Kalamarias F.C.Goran Popov – Proodeftiki F.C., AEK Athens, Egaleo F.C., Levadiakos F.C.

 Madagascar 
Éric Rabésandratana – AEK Athens 2001–2002
Franck Rabarivony – Skoda Xanthi 2002–2003

 Mali 
Mamadou Bagayoko – PAS Giannina 2011–2012Ousmane Coulibaly – Platanias, Panathinaikos 2014-
Mahamadou Diarra – OFI Crete 1998–1999
Fousseni Diawara – Panionios 2007–2010
Cédric Kanté – Panathinaikos 2009–2012
Mahamadou Sidibé – Egaleo FC, Kerkyra, PAS Giannina 2002–2008Yacouba Sylla – Panathinaikos 2017–
Sambou Yatabaré – Olympiacos 2013–2014

 Malta 
Justin Haber – Kerkyra
Andrew Hogg – Kalloni 2013–2016
André Schembri – Olympiakos Volou, Panionios

 Martinique 
Ludovic Clément – Panthrakikos F.C. 2008–2010
Kévin Olimpa – Platanias F.C. 2014–2016

 Mauritania 
Aboubakar Kamara – Aris F.C. 2021–
Khassa Camara – Xanthi 2016–2020
Adama Ba – PAS Lamia 1964 2021–

 Mauritius 
Lindsay Rose – Aris F.C. 2019–2021

 Mexico Mariano Trujillo – Skoda XanthiNery Castillo – Olympiacos, ArisAlan Pulido – Levadiakos, OlympiacosAntonio de Nigris – AEL 1964
Pedro Arce – Veria

 Moldova 
Roman Bolbocian – Asteras Tripolis
Stanislav Namașco – Levadiakos
Viorel Frunză – PAOK
Oleg Reabciuk – Olympiacos F.C.

 Montenegro 
Božidar Bandović – Olympiacos, Ethnikos Piraeus, Paniliakos, PAOK, Ethnikos Asteras 1997–2002
Srđan Blažić – Levadiakos, Panetolikos 2007–2010, 2011–2012Mladen Božović – Larissa 2017–
Andrija Delibašić – AEK Athens 2005–2006
Petar Grbić – Olympiacos 2011–2012
Marko Janković – Olympiacos 2013–2014Miloš Stojčev – Atromitos, Platanias 2015–
Simon Vukčević – Levadiakos 2014–2015
Darko Zorić – AEK Athens 2014–2017

 Morocco 
Salaheddine Bassir – Aris Thessaloniki 2002–2003
Nabil Baha – AEK Athens 2010–2011Chahir Belghazouani – Levadiakos 2015–
Ouasim Bouy – Panathinaikos 2014–2015
Mehdi Carcela  – Olympiacos 2017–18
Saïd Chiba – Aris Thessaloniki 2001–2003
Manuel da Costa – Olympiacos 2015–2017Omar El Kaddouri – PAOK 2017–
Talal El Karkouri – Aris Thessaloniki 2000–2001
Nabil El Zhar – PAOK 2010–2011
Karim Fegrouche – PAS Giannina 2011–2013Rachid Hamdani – Asteras Tripolis 2015–
Hachim Mastour – Lamia 2018–19
Abdeslam Ouaddou – Olympiacos 2005–2006
Abderrahim Ouakili – Skoda Xanthi 2001–2003
Jaouad Zairi – Asteras Tripolis, Olympiacos, PAS Giannina 2007–2012
Youssef El-Arabi – Olympiacos

 Mozambique Clésio Baúque – Panetolikos 2016–
Simão Mate – Panathinaikos 2007–2012
Paito – Skoda Xanthi 2013–2014

 Netherlands  
Ibrahim Afellay – Olympiacos 2014–2015
George Boateng – Skoda Xanthi 2010–2011
David Mendes da Silva – Panathinaikos 2013–2015
Paul de Lange – Veria 2007–2008
Maurice van Ham – PAOK 1995-1997
Youssouf Hersi – AEK Athens 2009–2010
Danny Hoesen – PAOK 2013–2014
Leandro Kappel – Doxa Drama 2011–2012
Ruud Knol – PAOK 2007–2008
Richard Knopper – Aris Thessaloniki 2002–2003
Michel Kreek – AEK Athens 2002–2004
Nicky Kuiper – Panathinaikos 2012–2013
Tschen La Ling – Panathinaikos 1982–1984
Nassir Maachi – Apollon Smyrni  2017–2018
Darren Maatsen – Apollon Smyrni  2017–
Hedwiges Maduro – PAOK 2014–2015
Stefano Seedorf – Veria 2007–2008
Gaston Taument – OFI Crete 1999–2000
Frans van Rooy – PAOK 1994–1995
Charlton Vicento – PAS Giannina 2013–2014Boy Waterman – OFI Crete 2020–
Nordin Wooter – Panathinaikos 2004–2006

 New Zealand 
Kosta Barbarouses  – Panathinaikos 2012–2013
Kris Bright  – Panserraikos F.C. 2008–2009Themistoklis Tzimopoulos  – PAS Giannina 2010–

 Nigeria 
Olubayo Adefemi – Skoda Xanthi 2010–2011
Ayodele Adeleye – Ergotelis 2013–2014
Victor Agali – Skoda Xanthi, Levadiakos 2008–2010
Abdul Jeleel Ajagun – Panathinaikos F.C., Levadiakos 2013–2016
Haruna Babangida – Olympiacos 2005–2007
Wilson Oruma – AO Kavala 2009–2010
Macauley Chrisantus – AEK Athens, PAS Lamia 1964 2015–2016
Emmanuel Ekwueme – Aris Thessaloniki 2004–2005Emmanuel Emenike – Olympiacos 2017–
Joseph Enakarhire – Panathinaikos F.C. 2007–2008
John Ibeh – Aris Thessaloniki 2013–2014
Brown Ideye – Olympiacos 2015–2017
Stephen Makinwa – AEL 1964 2010–2011
David Nazim – Kerkyra – 2016–2017
Joseph Nwafor – OFI Crete 2004–2008Nwankwo Obiora – Levadiakos F.C. 2017–
Patrick Ogunsoto – Ergotelis 2008–2010
Michael Olaitan – Veria, Olympiacos, Ergotelis, Panionios 2012–2015, 2016–2017
Ifeanyi Onyilo – Kerkyra – 2016–2017
Ifeanyi Udeze – Kavala, PAOK FC, AEK Athens 1997–2008
Chigozie Udoji – Asteras Tripoli, Platanias, Atromitos, Aris Thessaloniki 2009–2011, 2012–2014
Ugo Ukah – AEL Kalloni 2015–2016
Rashidi Yekini – Olympiacos 1994–1995
Henry Onyekuru – Olympiacos

 Northern Ireland 
Roy Carroll – OFI Crete, Olympiacos 2011–2014
Derek Spence – Olympiacos 1977–1978

 Norway 
Roger Albertsen – Olympiacos 1982–1985
Arne Dokken – Panathinaikos, Apollon Smyrnis 1981–1984
Omar Elabdellaoui – Olympiacos 2014–2020
Tarik Elyounoussi – Olympiacos 2016–2017
Abdisalam Ibrahim – Olympiacos, Ergotelis 2014–2015
Erik Mykland – Panathinaikos 1997–2000
Kjetil Osvold – PAOK 1988–1990
Frank Strandli – Panathinaikos 1997–1999
Roy Wassberg – Panionios 1996–1998

 Palestine  
Roberto Kettlun – Skoda Xanthi 2003–2004Saado Abdel Salam Fouflia – Platanias 2016–

 Panama 
Julio Segundo – Veria 2013–2015

 Paraguay 
Carlos Gamarra – AEK Athens 2001–2002
David Mesa – Atromitos
Roberto Doldan – Atromitos
Nery Bareiro – OFI Crete
Hernán Pérez – Olympiacos 2013–2014
Nelson Valdez – Olympiacos 2013–2014
Jorge Benítez – Olympiacos 2014–2015
Óscar Cardozo – Ólympiacos 2016–2017
Juan Iturbe – Aris F.C. 2021 -

 Peru 
Piero Alva – Skoda Xanthi
Carlos Ascues – Panetolikos
Paul Cominges – PAOK
Carlos Flores – Aris Thessaloniki
Roberto Merino – Atromitos
Darío Muchotrigo – Ionikos
Percy Olivares – PAOK, Panathinaikos
Miguel Rebosio – PAOKNolberto Solano – AEL 1964
Carlos Zegarra – PAOK

 Poland Bartłomiej Babiarz – Apollon Smyrni 2016–
Rafał Grzelak – Skoda Xanthi 2007–2009Piotr Grzelczak – Platanias 2017–
Roger Guerreiro – AEK Athens 2009–2013
Andrzej Juskowiak – Olympiacos 1995–1996
Krzysztof Król – Kalloni 2015–2016
Mariusz Kukiełka – PAOK 2002–2003
Marcin Kuźba – Olympiacos 2003–2004
Radosław Majdan- PAOK 2002–2003
Arkadiusz Malarz – Skoda Xanthi, Panathinaikos F.C., OFI Crete, AEL 1964 2006–2010
Marcin Mięciel – Iraklis Thessaloniki, PAOK 2002–2007
Grzegorz Mielcarski – AEK Athens 2000–2001
Maciej Murawski – Aris Thessaloniki, Apollon Kalamarias 2004–2009
Mirosław Okoński – AEK Athens, Korinthos 1988–1992
Emmanuel Olisadebe – Panathinaikos F.C., Skoda Xanthi 2001–2007
Leszek Pisz – PAOK 1996–1997
Sebastian Przyrowski – Levadiakos 2013–2014
Igor Sypniewski – Kavala, Panathinaikos F.C., OFI Crete 1997–2001
Mirosław Sznaucner – PAOK 2007–2012
Józef Wandzik – Panathinaikos F.C., Apollon Smyrnis, Athinaikos F.C. 1990–2001
Krzysztof Warzycha – Panathinaikos F.C. 1989–2004
Tomasz Wisio – Ergotelis 2009–2012
Michał Żewłakow – Olympiacos 2006–2010
Maciej Żurawski – AEL 1964 2008–2009

 Portugal 
Hugo Almeida – AEK Athens 2016–2017
Geraldo Alves – AEK Athens 2007–2010
Bruno Alves – AEK Athens 2004–2005
Hélder Barbosa – AEK Athens 2014–2016
Carlos Chaínho – Panathinaikos 2002–2003
Sérgio Conceição – PAOK 2008–2010
Paulo Costa – Aris Thessaloniki, Levadiakos 2006–2007, 2009–2010
Hélder Cristóvão – AEL 1964 2005–2006
Dani – Iraklis Thessaloniki, Skoda Xanthi 2010–2013
Francisco Delgado – Skoda Xanthi 2006–2008
Edinho – AEK Athens, PAOK 2007–2010
Hugo Faria – Kalloni 2013–2014
Daniel Fernandes – PAOK, Iraklis Thessaloniki, Panathinaikos, OFI Crete 2003–2008, 2009–2011Diogo Figueiras – Olympiacos 2016–
António Folha – AEK Athens 2001–2002
Hernâni – Olympiacos 2015–2016Hélder Lopes – AEK Athens 2017–
Paulo Machado – Olympiacos 2012–2014
Ariza Makukula – OFI Crete 2013–2014
Manú – AEK Athens 2007–2008
André Martins – Olympiacos 2016–2018
Carlos Milhazes – OFI Crete, Levadiakos 2013–2017
Jorge Filipe Monteiro – Iraklis Thessaloniki 2015–2017
Gonçalo Paciência – Olympiacos 2016–2017
Pelé – Ergotelis, Olympiacos 2013–2015
Danilo Pereira – Aris Thessaloniki 2010–2011
Hélder Postiga – Panathinaikos 2007–2008Nuno Reis – Panathinaikos 2016–André Simões – AEK Athens 2015–
Paulo Sousa – Panathinaikos 2000–2001Vieirinha – PAOK 2008-2012 and 2017–
Miguel Vítor – PAOK 2013–2016
Zequinha – Panthrakikos 2013–2014

 Qatar 
 Wagner Renan Ribeiro – Panionios 2006–2009

 Romania  
Denis Alibec – Atromitos 2021–2022
Marian Aliuță – Iraklis 2006–2007
Valentin Badea – Panserraikos FC 2008–2009Claudiu Bălan – PAS Giannina F.C. 2022–
Cosmin Bărcăuan – PAOK, OFI Crete 2006–2010
Mugurel Buga – Skoda Xanthi 2010–2011
Florin Călugărița  – Proodeftiki F.C. 1997–1998
Stelian Carabaș – Skoda Xanthi 2004–2006
Gheorghe Ceaușilă – PAOK 1993–1994
Aurelian Chițu – PAS Giannina F.C. 2013–2014
Sorin Colceag – Panionios G.S.S. 2004–2005
Marcel Coraș – Panionios G.S.S. 1990–1991
Cornel Cornea  – OFI Crete 2008–2009
Silvian Cristescu – Panelefsiniakos F.C. 1998–1999
Marius Ciugarin – Makedonikos F.C. 1982–1983
Emil Dică – Skoda Xanthi 2011–2012
Nicolae Dică – Iraklis 2009–2010
Anton Doboș – AEK Athens F.C. 1996–1998Cristian Ganea – Aris Thessaloniki, Panathinaikos F.C. 2020–
Dorin Goian – Asteras Tripoli 2013–2016
Ovidiu Herea – Skoda Xanthi 2015–2016
Victoraș Iacob – Iraklis, Aris Thessaloniki 2009–2012
Sabin Ilie – Iraklis 2006–2007
Adrian Iordache – Levadiakos 2004–2005
Ilie Iordache – AEK Athens F.C. 2009–2010
Anghel Iordănescu  – OFI Crete 1982–1984
Eduard Iordănescu  – Panionios G.S.S. 1998–1999
Marian Ivan – Aris Thessaloniki, Panionios G.S.S. 1990–1991, 1995–1996
Steliano Filip  – AEL 1964 2020–2021
Răzvan Fritea – Veria F.C. 2007–2008
Costin Lazăr – PAOK, Panetolikos, Iraklis 2011–2017
Erik Lincar – Panathinaikos F.C., Akratitos 2002–2004
Florin Lovin – Kerkyra 2011–2012
Dănuț Lupu – Panathinaikos F.C., Korinthos, OFI Crete 1990–1994
Mihail Majearu – Panachaiki F.C. 1990–1991
Bogdan Mara – Iraklis, Skoda Xanthi 2009–2012
Lucian Marinescu – Akratitos 2005–2006
Cosmin Matei – Atromitos 2015–2016
Florentin Matei – Apollon Smyrnis 2021–2022
Dumitru Mitu – Panathinaikos F.C. 2004–2005
Marius Mitu – Skoda Xanthi, Panthrakikos F.C. 2008–2010
Nelu Mitrică – Proodeftiki F.C. 1997–1998
Alexandru Mitriță – PAOK 2021–2022Sebastian Mladen – Panetolikos 2022–
Vlad Morar – Panetolikos 2017–2019
Eugen Neagoe – Veria F.C. 1997–1998
Ionuț Nedelcearu – AEK Athens F.C. 2020–2021
Doru Nicolae – Panathinaikos F.C. 1980–1982
Marius Niculae  – Kavala F.C. 2010–2011
Daniel Orac – Panthrakikos F.C. 2009–2010
Ionel Pârvu – PAOK 1996–1997
Lucian Pârvu – Ergotelis 2003–2006
Constantin Pană – Panachaiki F.C. 1990–1992Adrian Petre – Levadiakos F.C. 2022–
Marius Predatu – Panionios G.S.S. 1995–1996
Florin Prunea – Skoda Xanthi 2004–2005
Răzvan Raț – PAOK 2014–2015Dorin Rotariu – Atromitos 2022–
Lucian Sânmărtean – Panathinaikos F.C. 2003–2007
Florin Stângă – Skoda Xanthi 2009–2010
Bogdan Stelea – Akratitos 2005–2006
Ștefan Stoica – AEL 1964, Veria F.C. 1991–1999
Dennis Șerban – AEL 1964 2005–2006
Marius Șuleap – OFI Crete  2008–2009
Alin Toșca – PAOK 2018-2019
Gabriel Torje – AEL 1964 2020–2021

 Russia 
Juri Lodigin – Skoda Xanthi 2011–2013
Yuri Savichev – Olympiacos 1990–1992
Omari Tetradze – PAOK 1999–2001
Oleg Veretennikov – Aris Thessaloniki 1999–2000

 Rwanda 
Fritz Emeran – Levadiakos 2007–2009
Edwin Ouon – Levadiakos 2015–2017

 São Tomé and Príncipe  Jordão Diogo – Panthrakikos, Kerkyra 2013–

 Saudi Arabia 
Amiri Kurdi – Panionios 2009–2014

 Scotland 
Craig Brewster – Ionikos 1996–2001
Lee Bullen – Kalamata 1998–2000
Islam Feruz – OFI Crete 2014

 Senegal 
Ismail Ba – Skoda Xanthi, Aris Thessaloniki 1998–2004
Henri Camara – Atromitos, Panetolikos 2010–2014Pape Abou Cissé – Olympiacos 2017–
Papa Bouba Diop – AEK Athens 2010–2011
El Hadji Diouf – AEK Athens 2010–2011
Macoumba Kandji – Levadiakos F.C. 2013–2014
Paul Keita – PAS Giannina, Kalloni, Atromitos 2009–2017
Pape M'Bow – Panthrakikos, Atromitos 2013–2016Jackson Mendy – Levadiakos F.C. 2012–2013, 2016–
Guirane N'Daw – Asteras Tripoli 2013–2014
Dame N'Doye – Panathinaikos, OFI Crete 2007–2009Ibrahima Niasse – Levadiakos – 2016–
Khalifa Sankaré – Aris Thessaloniki, Asteras Tripoli, Olympiakos Volou 2010–2016
Ibrahim Tall – AEL 1964 2010–2012
Mame Baba Thiam – PAOK 2016–2017
Badou Ndiaye – Aris Thessaloniki 2021 -Ousseynou Ba – Olympiacos

 Serbia 
Branimir Aleksić – Kalloni 2014–2015Siniša Babić – AEL 1964 2017–
Božidar Bandović – Olympiacos, PAOK 1997–2000
Nikola Beljić – Panserraikos, Atromitos, Platanias, Skoda Xanthi 2010–2015
Nenad Bjeković – AEK Athens 1999–2000
Milan Bojović – Panetolikos F.C. 2012–2014
Željko Brkić – PAOK 2016–18
Dragan Ćirić – AEK Athens 1999–2000Uroš Ćosić – AEK Athens 2017–
Predrag Đorđevićì – Olympiacos 1996–2009
Goran Drulić – OFI Crete 2006–2008
Milan Đurđević – PAOK, PAS Giannina 1991–1993, 1997–1998Uroš Đurđević – Olympiacos 2017–
Ljubomir Fejsa – Olympiacos 2011–2014
Danijel Gašić – Kalloni F.C. 2012–2013
Brana Ilić – PAS Giannina 2012–2016
Ivica Iliev – PAOK FC 2007–2008
Ilija Ivić – Olympiacos, Aris Thessaloniki, AEK Athens 1994–1999, 2000–2002
Vladimir Ivić – AEK Athens, Aris Thessaloniki, PAOK F.C. 2005–2012
Rajko Janjanin – OFI Crete, AEK FC 1985–1988
Borislav Jovanović – Ergotelis FC 2011–2015Marko Jovanović – AEL 2017–
Željko Kalajdžić – Kavala, OFI Crete, Platanias 2008–2015
Aleksandar Katai – OFI Crete, Platanias 2011–2012, 2013–2014
Darko Kovačević – Olympiacos 2007–2009
Slobodan Krčmarević – PAOK, Panionios 1998–2000
Milan Lukač – AEK Athens 2009–2011
Nikola Malbaša – AEK Athens 2005–2006
Miloš Marić – Olympiacos 2004–2007
Nebojša Marinković – Iraklis Thessaloniki 2007–2008
Neven Marković – Kerkyra 2010–2011
Vladimir Matijašević – AEK Athens 1999–2000
Kristijan Miljević – Levadiakos, Veria 2016–
Vladan Milosavljev – Levadiakos, OFI Crete 2014–2015, 2016–2017
Branko Milovanović – AEK Athens, Ethnikos Asteras 1998–1999
Luka Milivojević – Olympiacos 2014–2017
Igor Mirčeta – Platanias 2011–2013Nikola Mirković – Atromitos 2017–
Zdenko Muf – PAS Giannina, Kalamata 1993–1996, 2002–2003
Perica Ognjenović – Ergotelis FC 2006–2008
Marko Pantelić – Iraklis Thessaloniki, Olympiacos 1996–1997, 2010–2013
Gordan Petrić – AEK Athens 1998–1999
Pavle Popara – Apollon Kalamarias 2006–2007Aleksandar Prijović – PAOK 2016–
Marko Šćepović – Olympiacos 2013–2014
Aleksandar Simić – OFI Crete 2007–2009
Slađan Spasić – PAOK 2000–2005Filip Stanisavljević – Platanias 2015–
Vladimir Stojković – Ergotelis FC 2013–2014
Ivan Tasić – Ergotelis FC, Levadiakos 2006–2008, 2010–2011
Zvonimir Vukić – PAOK, Veria 2013–2015Jagoš Vuković – Olympiacos 2017–Saša Zdjelar – Olympiacos 2015–2016, 2017–Živko Živković – Xanthi 2016–

 Sierra Leone 
Aziz Deen-Conteh – Ergotelis 2013–2014
Mohamed Kallon – AEK Athens 2007–2008
John Kamara – Apollon Smyrni 2012–2014

 Singapore 
Fandi Ahmad – OFI Crete 1989–1990

 Slovakia Mário Breška – Panionios, Olympiakos Volou, Asteras TripolisJuraj Buček – Skoda Xanthi, Olympiacos, Aris Thessaloniki F.C.Peter Doležaj – Olympiakos Volos, PanetolikosPavol Farkaš – Skoda Xanthi, AEL 1964Vladimír Janočko – Skoda XanthiErik Jendrišek – Skoda Xanthi 2017–Pavel Kováč – Apollon Kalamarias, Olympiacos
Marian Kelemen – Aris Thessaloniki F.C.Tomáš Košický – Asteras TripolisFrantišek Kubík – ErgotelisJozef Kozlej – AEL 1964, ThrasyvoulosMilan Luhový – PAOKRóbert Mak – PAOKDušan Perniš – IraklisMiroslav Stoch – PAOK
Zdeno Štrba – Skoda Xanthi 2009–2011
Vladimir Weiss – Olympiacos 2013–2014

 Slovenia 
Rok Elsner – Aris F.C. 2013–2014
Suad Fileković – Ergotelis 2004–2005
Matic Kotnik – Panionios 2017–
Džoni Novak – Olympiacos 2002–2003
Denis Popović – Panthrakikos 2013−2014
Aleksandar Radosavljević – AEL 1964 2009–2010
Dino Seremet – Panthrakikos 2013–2014
Ermin Šiljak – Panionios 2002–2003
Mirnes Šišić – AEL 1964, Olympiacos, Iraklis Thessaloniki, OFI Crete 2005–2008, 2009–2015 
Andraž Struna – PAS Giannina 2013–2016
Zlatko Zahovič – Olympiacos 1999–2000

 South Africa 
Pierre Issa – OFI Crete 2005–2009
Bongani Khumalo – PAOK FC 2012–2013
Pitso Mosimane – Ionikos 1989–1995
Nasief Morris – Aris Thessaloniki, Panathinaikos 2001–2008
Bryce Moon – Panathinaikos, PAOK FC 2008–2010
Patrick Phungwayo – Panionios 2009–2010Andrew Rabutla – PAOK FC 1997–1998
Glen Salmon – PAOK FC 2007–2008 
Dillon Sheppard – Panionios 2004–2005

 Spain 
Noé Acosta – Olympiakos Volou, Aris Thessaloniki, Levadiakos, PAS Giannina, Lamia
Aarón – Iraklis Thessaloniki
David Aganzo – Aris Thessaloniki F.C.
Carlos Aguilera – PlataniasAñete – Apollon Smyrni 2017–
Alberto Belsué – Iraklis ThessalonikiAlberto Botía – Olympiacos 2014–
Raúl Bravo – Olympiacos, Veria 2007–2011, 2014–2015
Antonio Calvo – Aris Thessaloniki F.C.Jorge Casado – Skoda Xanthi 2017–
José María Cases – Panthrakikos
David Cerra – Platanias
Alejandro Chacopino – AEL 2016–2017
Thomas Christiansen – Panionios FC 1999–2000
Pablo Coira – Aris Thessaloniki F.C.
Alberto de la Bella – Olympiacos
Javi de Pedro – Ergotelis FC
David Fuster – Olympiacos
Dani – Olympiacos 2005–2007
Jon Andoni García – Aris Thessaloniki F.C.
Moisés Hurtado – Olympiacos 2010–11
Javito – Aris Thessaloniki F.C., Olympiacos, Panthrakikos
Miguel Ángel Ramos – Atromitos
César Alberto Pérez – Atromitos
José Reyes – Aris Thessaloniki F.C., Atromitos, Levadiakos 2006–2008
Sergio Olivares – Atromitos
Óscar – Ólympiacos
Albert Riera – Olympiacos 2010–2011
Iván Marcano – Olympiacos
Koke – Aris Thessaloniki F.C.
Miguel Torres – Olympiacos
Roberto – Olympiacos
Josu Sarriegi – Panathinaikos F.C.
Víctor – Panathinaikos F.C.
Luis García – Panathinaikos F.C. 2010–2011
Nano – Panathinaikos F.C.
Toni González – PAOK FC
Jacobo – PAOK FC
Lucas – PAOK FC
Íñigo López – PAOK FC
Juanfran – AEK Athens F.C.
Felipe Sanchón – Aris Thessaloniki F.C.
Míchel – AEK Athens F.C.
David Mateos – AEK Athens F.C.
Rubén Palazuelos – Aris Thessaloniki F.C.
Álex Pérez – Aris Thessaloniki F.C.
Kiko Ratón – Iraklis Thessaloniki
Francisco Yeste – Olympiacos
Francisco Martos – Iraklis Thessaloniki
Fernando Marqués – Iraklis Thessaloniki
Carlos Merino – Panthrakikos
Xavi Moro – Iraklis Thessaloniki 2007–2008
Piti – Lamia 2017–
Sito Riera – Panthrakikos
José Manuel Roca – Panthrakikos
Juan Velasco – Panthrakikos
Changui – Skoda Xanthi
Caracol – Ionikos FC
Aarón Escudero – Aris Thessaloniki F.C.
José Carlos – AEK Athens
Rubén Pulido – Aris Thessaloniki F.C.
Ximo Navarro – Asteras Tripoli
Juanma – Asteras Tripoli, AEL Kalloni
Rayo – Asteras Tripoli 2011–2013
David Torres – Platanias
Fernando Usero – Asteras Tripoli
Aleix Vidal – Panthrakikos 2008–2009
Jordi Vidal – Kalloni 2014–2015
Dídac Vilà – AEK Athens F.C.
Walter – Skoda Xanthi, Panthrakikos

 St. Kitts and Nevis 
Keith Gumbs – Panionios
Febian Brandy – Panetolikos 2012

 Suriname 
Diego Biseswar – PAOK 2016–2021
Nigel Hasselbaink – Veria 2014–2015

 Sweden 
Thomas Ahlström – Olympiacos 1979–1982
Mikael Antonsson – Panathinaikos F.C. 2006–2007
Emir Bajrami – Panathinaikos F.C. 2013–2015
Valmir Berisha – Panathinaikos F.C. 2014–2015
Mattias Bjärsmyr – Panathinaikos F.C. 2009–2010, 2011–2012
Marcus Berg – Panathinaikos F.C. 2013–2017
Mikael Dahlberg – Apollon Smyrni 2013–2014
Jimmy Durmaz – Olympiacos 2014–2016
Oscar Hiljemark – Panathinaikos 2017–18Niklas Hult – Panathinaikos - AEK Athens 2016–18, 2018-
Jakob Johansson – AEK Athens 2015–18
Sonny Karlsson – Kalloni 2015–2016
Daniel Majstorović – AEK Athens 2008–2010
Guillermo Molins – Panathinaikos 2017–18
Olof Mellberg – Olympiacos 2009–2012
Mikael Nilsson – Panathinaikos F.C. 2005–2009
Sotiris Papagiannopoulos – P.A.O.K. 2014–2015
Håkan Sandberg – AEK Athens – Olympiacos 1985–1988
Tom Söderberg – Apollon Smyrni 2013–2014
Pär Zetterberg – Olympiacos 2000–2003

 Switzerland 
Damian Bellón – Veria, Panetolikos 2012–2014
Eldin Jakupović – Olympiakos Volou, Aris Thessaloniki 2010–2012
Pajtim Kasami – Olympiacos 2014–2016
Fabian Stoller – Platanias 2013–2014
Steven Zuber – AEK Athens F.C.
Darko Jevtić – AEK Athens F.C.

 Syria 
Mohammad Nasser Afash – Ionikos, Proodeftiki 1993–2004
Khaled Al Zaher – Atromitos, Proodeftiki, Thrasyvoulos, Halkidona 1998–2006
Said Bayazid – Proodeftiki 1999–2002
Louay Chanko – AEK Athens 2005–2006
Ibrahim Mughrabi – AEK Athens F.C. 1962–1963 first ever foreign player in GreeceAbdul Rahman Oues – Platanias 2017–Aias Aosman – Ionikos

 Togo  
Mathieu Dossevi – Olympiacos 2014–2015
Alaixys Romao  – Olympiacos 2016–18 

 Trinidad and Tobago 
Levi García – AEK Athens F.C. 2020-

 Tunisia 
Selim Ben Djemia – Lamia 2018
Mehdi Nafti – Aris Thessaloniki 2009–2011
Nabil Taïder – Skoda Xanthi 2008–2009
Anis Boussaïdi – PAOK 2010–2011
Hamza Younés – Skoda Xanthi 2016–2017
Yassine Meriah – Olympiacos F.C. 2018-2020
Nassim Hnid – AEK Athens 2020
Wajdi Sahli – Apollon Smyrnis 2021-
Mohamed Dräger – Olympiacos F.C. 2020-2021

 Turkey 
Fatih Akyel – PAOK 2005–2006
Deniz Baykara – Skoda Xanthi, Panthrakikos 2001–2008, 2011–2016
Erol Bulut – Panionios, Olympiacos, Olympiakos Volou, OFI Crete 2002–2003, 2005–2007, 2009–2010, 2011–2012
Colin Kazim-Richards – Olympiacos 2011–2012
Lefter Küçükandonyadis – AEK Athens 1963–1964
Nikos Kovis – Panathinaikos, OFI Crete 1978–1985
Tümer Metin – AEL 1964, Kerkyra 2008–2012Emre Mor - Olympiacos 2020-

 Ukraine  Yevhen Budnik – Platanias 2017–Dmytro Chyhrynskyi – AEK Athens 2016–
Oleg Iachtchouk – Ergotelis
Hennadiy Lytovchenko – Olympiacos 1991–1993
Oleg Protasov – Olympiacos 1990–1994
Yevhen Shakhov – PAOK 2016–
Andriy Tsurikov – Levadiakos 2015–2016
Oleh Venhlynskyi – AEK Athens

 United States 
Freddy Adu – Aris Thessaloniki FC 2009–2010
Andreas Chronis – AEK Athens F.C. 2008–2009
Ted Chronopoulos – Panionios FC 1993–1996
Nicholas Gaitan – OFI Crete
Eddie Johnson – Aris Thessaloniki FC 2009–2010
Gus Kartes – Olympiacos 1997–2000
Frank Klopas – AEK Athens F.C. 1998–1994
Clint Mathis – Ergotelis 2007–2008
Gboly Ariyibi – Panetolikos 2019–2021

 Uruguay 
Sebastián Abreu – Aris Thessaloniki 2009–2010
Diego Aguirre – Olympiacos
Adrián Balboa – Panathinaikos F.C.
Jorge Barrios – Olympiacos, Levadiakos
Joe Bizera – PAOK
Claudio Dadómo – AEK Athens, Ergotelis
Jorge Díaz – Panetolikos 2017–
Juan Manuel Díaz – AEK Athens 2016–2017Fabián Estoyanoff – Panionios
Bruno Fornaroli – Panathinaikos F.C.Pablo García – PAOK, Skoda Xanthi
Nacho González – Levadiakos F.C.Alejandro Lembo – Aris Thessaloniki
Fernando Machado – Levadiakos F.C.
Álvaro Recoba – PanioniosMario Regueiro''' – Aris Thessaloniki
Claudio Rivero – Panionios
Rodrigo Sanguinetti – Levadiakos F.C.

Uzbekistan 
Jafar Irismetov – Panathinaikos F.C. 1997–1998
Giannis Mandzoukas – Panathinaikos F.C.

Wales  
Gareth Roberts – Panionios 1999

Venezuela  
Alain Baroja – AEK Athens 2015-2016
Ronald Vargas – AEK Athens 2015-2017
César Castro – Atromitos
Dani Hernández – Asteras Tripoli
Francisco Pol Hurtado – Asteras Tripoli AEL Larissa
Ricardo Páez – Veria

Zambia  
Christopher Katongo – Skoda Xanthi F.C. 2010-11
Ashious Melu – Apollon Kalamarias 1989–90

Zimbabwe 
Kennedy Nagoli – Aris Salonika, PAS Giannena 1997–2003
Zenzo Moyo – Atromitos
Lincoln Zvasiya – OFI Crete 2013–2014

Notes

References

Greece
Football
 
 
Association football player non-biographical articles